Palenque Municipality is a municipality in Chiapas in south Mexico.

Neighboring municipalities 
Neighboring municipalities are Catazajá to the north, La Libertad to the east, Ocosingo and Chilón to the south, Salto de Agua to the west, and the other Mexican stat – Tabasco to the north and east, and country Guatemala to the southeast.

Localities 
There are 683 localities, the largest of which are:

References

Municipalities of Chiapas